The Liberty Bowl is an annual American college football bowl game played in late December or early January since 1959. For its first five years, it was played at Philadelphia Municipal Stadium in Philadelphia before being held at Atlantic City (New Jersey) Convention Hall in 1964. Since 1965, the game has been held at Simmons Bank Liberty Stadium in Memphis, Tennessee. Because of the scheduling of the bowl game near the end of the calendar year, no game was played during calendar years 2008 or 2015, while two games were played in calendar years 2010 and 2016.

Since 2004, the game has been sponsored by Memphis-based auto parts retailer AutoZone and officially known as the AutoZone Liberty Bowl. Previous sponsors include St. Jude Children's Research Hospital (1993–1996) and AXA Financial (1997–2003).

History

A. F. "Bud" Dudley, a former Villanova athletic director, created the Liberty Bowl in Philadelphia in 1959. The game was played at Philadelphia's Municipal Stadium. It was the only cold-weather bowl game of its time, and was plagued by poor attendance. The first game was the most successful of the five held in Philadelphia, as 38,000 fans watched Penn State beat Alabama, 7–0, in the bowl's inaugural edition.

A group of Atlantic City businessmen convinced Dudley to move his game from Philadelphia to Atlantic City's Convention Hall for 1964 and guaranteed Dudley $25,000. It would be the first major (University Division, now Division I) bowl game played indoors. AstroTurf was still in its developmental stages and was unavailable for the game. To keep the grass growing, artificial lighting was installed and kept on 24 hours a day. The entire process cost about $16,000. End zones were only 8 yards long, rather than the regulation 10 yards. 6,059 fans saw Utah rout West Virginia, 32–6. Dudley was paid $25,000 from Atlantic City businessmen, $60,000 from the gate, and $95,000 from television revenues, and cleared $10,000 net profit.

In 1965, Dudley moved the game to Memphis, Tennessee, where it made its home at Memphis Memorial Stadium to much larger crowds; the venue was renamed as Liberty Bowl Memorial Stadium in December 1975. Having been played every college football season since 1959, the game has established itself as one of the oldest non-New Year's Six bowls.

Matchup
During the late 1980s and early 1990s, the Liberty Bowl offered an automatic invitation to the winner of the Commander-in-Chief's Trophy, if that team was bowl eligible. Due to the limited success of service academy football during this era, the only academy to appear in the Liberty Bowl as a result of this arrangement was Air Force, which appeared in four consecutive games, 1989–1992.

Beginning in 1996, the Liberty Bowl began an affiliation with the newly launched Conference USA (C-USA), offering its champion an automatic bid. Beginning in 2005, the winner of C-USA was determined by the newly created C-USA championship game. The winner of that game was customarily offered the bowl berth from 2005 to 2013.

In 1996 and 1997, the opponent for the C-USA champion was a team from the Big East. In 1998, the Liberty Bowl replaced the Holiday Bowl in a shared contract with the Cotton Bowl and had second choice between the WAC champion and a team from the SEC. From 1999 to 2005, the opponent for the C-USA champion was the Mountain West champion. There were two exceptions:
2004: Mountain West champion Utah qualified for the BCS. In their place, the Liberty Bowl chose WAC champion Boise State.
2005: Mountain West champion TCU chose to play in the 2005 Houston Bowl. At-large WAC team Fresno State took their place.

In 1999, the Mountain West Conference did not have an outright champion, as three teams tied for the conference lead. The conference's bid for the game was given to Colorado State.

The bowl's contract from 2006 until 2013 pitted the winner of the C-USA championship game against the eighth pick from the SEC. The American was to provide its fifth-place team as an alternate if the SEC could not provide a team. The SEC was also given veto power for the bowl, and elected to use it in 2011 to block C-USA champion Southern Miss from playing Vanderbilt; instead, Cincinnati got the spot and Southern Miss accepted an invitation to the 2011 Hawaii Bowl instead.

Since 2014, the matchup features a team from the SEC against the fourth pick from the Big 12 Conference. The Liberty Bowl is part of a six-bowl SEC pool arrangement that also involves the Duke's Mayo (formerly Belk) in odd-numbered years or the Las Vegas in even-numbered years, Music City, ReliaQuest, Gator, and Texas bowls; these bowls will choose one representative from the conference each, while the College Football Playoff receiving first choice (usually the Sugar Bowl in years it does not serve as a national semifinal) and the Citrus Bowl second choice.

The game is televised nationally on ESPN, and is carried nationwide by ESPN Radio, and internationally by ESPN International.

Recent matchups of note
The 2010 win by UCF was the program's first-ever bowl victory.

The 2011 game matched Coaches' Poll 24th-ranked Cincinnati against upstart Vanderbilt, and unlike most lower tier bowls, it aired on the broadcast network ABC rather than its cable brethren ESPN. Cincinnati defeated Vanderbilt in a second-half comeback.

The 2012 Liberty Bowl featured an unusual rematch of a regular season game between the Iowa State Cyclones (9th place in the Big 12) and the Tulsa Golden Hurricane (C-USA champions). Iowa State had defeated Tulsa, 38–23, in the season's first weekend, however Tulsa defeated Iowa State, 31–17, in the Liberty Bowl. Though the bowl normally selects a team from the SEC, it invited Iowa State because the SEC did not have enough bowl-eligible teams to fill all of its contracted bowl games.

In 2020, after a matchup of West Virginia and Tennessee was announced on December 20, the Tennessee program had to withdraw on December 21 due to positive COVID-19 testing. Army, who had accepted an invitation to the Independence Bowl before it was cancelled due to a lack of available teams, was named as their replacement.

In the 2022 matchup, Kansas made their first bowl game appearance in 14 years, against Arkansas. The Razorbacks took an early 38–13 lead in the game. The Jayhawks then scored 25 unanswered points to send the game into overtime. The teams traded touchdowns in the first and second overtime. In the third overtime, with teams alternating two-point conversion attempts per NCAA overtime rules, the Razorbacks scored on their attempt and stopped the Jayhawks' attempt, resulting in a 55–53 Arkansas win. Kansas quarterback Jalon Daniels set a Kansas single-game record and a Liberty Bowl record for passing yards, with 544.

Game results

The first five editions (1959–1963) were played in Philadelphia, Pennsylvania. The 1964 game was played in Atlantic City, New Jersey. All subsequent editions have been played in Memphis, Tennessee.

Rankings are based on the AP Poll prior to the game being played.

Source:

MVPs
The bowl has named a single MVP for each game, since inception. In nine instances, the MVP has played on the losing team, including four instances in a seven-game span during 1977–1983. The most recent MVP to play on the losing team was Kwame Ellis of Stanford in 1995. Quarterback Rob Perez of Air Force was named MVP twice, in 1990 and 1991.

Source:
 indicates the MVP played on the losing team

Most appearances
Updated through the December 2022 edition (64 games, 128 total appearances).

Teams with multiple appearances

Teams with a single appearance
Won (12): Baylor, Cincinnati, Georgia Tech, Indiana, Kentucky, Nebraska, Notre Dame, Oklahoma State, Oregon State, Purdue, Texas Tech, USC

Lost (16): Army, Boise State, Boston College, Fresno State, Maryland, Memphis, Michigan State, Minnesota, North Carolina, Oregon, Pittsburgh, Rice, Stanford, UCLA, Vanderbilt, Villanova

Source:

Appearances by conference
Updated through the December 2022 edition (64 games, 128 total appearances).

 Games marked with an asterisk (*) were played in January of the following calendar year.
 Records reflect conference membership at the time each game was played.
 The 1965 game was contested between two SEC teams. Two independent teams have met multiple times.
 Conferences that are defunct or no longer active in FBS are marked in italics.
 Today's Pac-12 Conference appeared in the bowl when the conference was the Pac-8 and Pac-10.
 The American's record includes appearances of the Big East Conference, as The American retains the charter of the original Big East, following its 2013 realignment. Teams representing the Big East appeared in three games, compiling a 2–1 record.
 Independent appearances: Army (2020), Boston College (1983), East Carolina (1994, 1995), Georgia Tech (1972), Louisville (1993), Miami (FL) (1961, 1966), Navy (1981), Notre Dame (1983), Oregon (1960), Oregon State (1962), Penn State (1959, 1960, 1979), South Carolina (1988), Syracuse (1961), Tulane (1970, 1979), Villanova (1962), VPI (1966, 1968).
 VPI is now known as Virginia Tech.

Every SEC member except Florida has played in the game.  Every current, former or future Big 12 member except Oklahoma and Texas have played in the game. A majority of teams that are members of the Power Five conferences have appeared in the game.

Game records

Source:

Media coverage

The earliest editions of the bowl were broadcast by NBC (1959–1963) and ABC (1964–1980). Several different networks carried the 1981 through 1989 games, including USA Network, Katz Broadcasting, and Raycom. Since 1990, the game has been broadcast predominantly by ESPN, with some editions on ABC.

References

External links
 

 
College football bowls
Sports competitions in Memphis, Tennessee
American football in Memphis, Tennessee
College football bowls in Tennessee
Recurring sporting events established in 1959
1959 establishments in Tennessee